As a given name, Kevan is a variant of the name Kevin (Caoimheán or Caomhán , an Irish diminutive form of Caoimhín; also anglicized Keevan or Cavan). The feminine variant   is Caoimhe (anglicised as Keeva or Kweeva).

The Irish surname Kevan is an anglicization of  Ó Géibheannaigh (also rendered Keaveney) or Caomhánach (also rendered Cavens).

Given name
Kevan Barbour (born 1949), international cricket umpire from Zimbabwe
Kevan Barlow (born 1979), former American football running back
Kevan Broadhurst (born 1959), English former professional footballer, coach and football manager
Kevan Brown (born 1966), retired English professional footballer
Kevan George (born 1990), Trinidadian footballer
Kevan Gosper, AO (born 1933), Australian former athlete who mainly competed in the 400 metres
Kevan Guy (born 1965), Canadian former professional ice hockey player
Kevan Hamilton (born 1934), former Australian rules footballer in the Victorian Football League
Kevan Hurst (born 1985), English professional footballer
Kevan James (born 1961), educated at the Edmonton County School, in the London Borough of Enfield
Kevan Jones (born 1964), British Labour Party politician, Member of Parliament (MP) for North Durham since 2001
Kevan Miller (born 1987), American professional ice hockey defenseman
Kevan Smith (footballer) (born 1959), English former footballer
Kevan Smith (baseball) (born 1988), American professional baseball catcher
Kevan Tebay (1936–1996), English cricketer active from 1959 to 1963
Kevan Foley (1998 -), Irish hospitality professional from southern Ireland

Surname
Joseph Kevan (1855–1891), English cricketer active in 1875
Douglas Keely Kevan (1895–1968) and his son D. K. M. Kevan (1920–1991), entomologists
Derek Kevan (1935–2013), English footballer
Martin Kevan (1947–2013), Canadian actor, voice actor, and author
Dave Kevan (born 1968), former Scottish footballer

Fictional characters
Kevan Lannister, a fictional character in the A Song of Ice and Fire series of fantasy novels by American author George R. R. Martin and its television adaptation Game of Thrones. He is the younger brother of Tywin Lannister.
Keevan (Star Trek)

See also
Caomhán of Inisheer
Caomhán mac Connmhach
Kevin, given name
Kevon, given name
Kavin, given name
KVAN (disambiguation)
Keyvan (disambiguation)
Klevan

References

Scottish masculine given names